Martin Izing (born 11 January 1992) is a Hungarian football player.

Career

Videoton
On 14 May 2011, Izing played his first match for Videoton in a 2-1 win against Győri ETO FC in the Hungarian League.

Club statistics

Updated to games played as of 8 December 2018.

References

External links
 
 

1992 births
Living people
Footballers from Budapest
Hungarian footballers
Hungary youth international footballers
Association football midfielders
FC Felcsút players
Fehérvár FC players
FC Tatabánya players
Vasas SC players
Mezőkövesdi SE footballers
Kisvárda FC players
BFC Siófok players
Dorogi FC players
Nemzeti Bajnokság I players
Nemzeti Bajnokság II players
Nemzeti Bajnokság III players